Luís Alonso Pérez, also known as Lula (1 March 1922 – 15 June 1972), was a Brazilian football manager, notably managing Santos from 1954 to 1966.

Lula is known as one of the most successful Brazilian football managers.

Career
Born in Santos, São Paulo, Lula worked as a taxicab, a baker and a milkman. He started to work as a manager with amateur clubs in his hometown, Palmeirinha and Americana. He subsequently joined Portuguesa Santista, in charge of the club's youth setup.

In January 1949, Lula signed his first contract with Santos FC, being the subdirector of the club's amateur sides. On 13 May 1952, he was named in charge of the club's youth teams.

Lula acted as an interim manager for two matches in 1952, as Aymoré Moreira was in charge of the São Paulo official team. He later became Moreira's assistant while was also in charge of the club's amateur sides, and on 2 June 1954, he replaced Italian Giuseppe Ottina as the first team manager.

Lula's first match in charge occurred three days later, a 3–2 win against Botafogo at the Maracanã Stadium. He led the club to the following year's Campeonato Paulista title, after a 20-year drought.

Lula was often described as the responsible for bringing together the team who was known as Os Santásticos; he made Pelé a regular starter from 1957, promoted Pagão and Pepe from the youth setup, brought Coutinho from lowly XV de Piracicaba and approved Dorval on a trial, after the latter was rejected by a number of clubs. In the 1960s, the club signed Calvet, Lima, Mengálvio and Zito, all recommended by the manager.

Lula left Peixe in the end of the 1966 season; although it is mainly attributed to the club's second place in the Taça Brasil, some reported altercations with Pelé are also attributed to the manager's departure. He left the club after being 945 matches in charge, with 619 wins, 144 draws and 182 defeats.

In 1967, Lula took over Portuguesa Santista before being appointed manager of Corinthians in November of that year. In charge for only 35 matches with the latter club, he helped the side to defeat former club Santos on 6 March 1968, ending an 11-year hoodoo.

Lula later worked for Portuguesa and Santo André in the early 1970s.

Death
Lula died on 15 June 1972, having a generalized infection due to a kidney transplant, worsened due to his hypertension.

Honours
Santos
Taça Brasil: 1961, 1962, 1963, 1964, 1965
Campeonato Paulista: 1955, 1956, 1958, 1960, 1961, 1962, 1964, 1965
Intercontinental Cup: 1962, 1963
Copa Libertadores: 1962, 1963
Torneio Rio-São Paulo: 1959, 1963, 1964, 1966

References

External links

1922 births
1972 deaths
Sportspeople from Santos, São Paulo
Brazilian people of Spanish descent
Brazilian football managers
Campeonato Brasileiro Série A managers
Santos FC managers
Sport Club Corinthians Paulista managers
Associação Atlética Portuguesa (Santos) managers
Associação Portuguesa de Desportos managers
Esporte Clube Santo André managers
Deaths from hypertension